London Plus may refer to:

London Plus, a former BBC regional magazine programme, broadcast 1984–1989
London Plus Credit Union, a savings and loans co-operative, based in Fulham